Philipp is both a surname and a given name. Notable people with the name include:

"Philipp" has also been a shortened version of Philippson, a German surname especially prevalent amongst German Jews and Dutch Jews.

Surname
 Adolf Philipp (1864–1936), German/American actor, composer and playwright
 David Philipp (biologist), biologist
 David Philipp (footballer) (born 2000), German footballer
 Elke Philipp (born 1964), German Paralympic equestrian
 Elliot Philipp (1915–2010), British gynaecologist and obstetrician 
 Franz Philipp (1890–1972), German church musician and composer
 Julius Philipp (1878–1944), German metal trader 
 Lutz Philipp (1940–2012), German long-distance runner
 Oscar Philipp (1882–1965), German and British metal trader
 Paul Philipp (born 1950), Luxembourgian football player and manager
 Peter Philipp (1971–2014), German writer and comedian
 Robert Philipp (1895–1981), American Impressionist painter

Given name
 Philipp Bönig (born 1980), German footballer
 Philipp von Cobenzl, Austrian diplomat
 Philipp Grubauer, German professional ice hockey goaltender
 Philipp Hainhofer, inventor of the cuckoo clock
 Philipp Heerwagen (born 1983), German footballer
 Philipp Heyden (born 1988), German basketball player
 Philipp Kohlschreiber, German tennis player
 Philipp Lahm (born 1983), German footballer
 Philipp Lienhart (born 1996), Austrian footballer
 Philipp Pentke (born 1985), German footballer
 Philipp Netzer (born 1985), Austrian footballer
 Philipp Langen (born 1986), German footballer
 Philipp Schmitt (1902–1950), German SS commandant of Nazi prison camp executed for war crimes
 Philipp Steiner (born 1986), Austrian footballer
 Philipp Muntwiler (born 1987), Swiss footballer
 Philipp Bargfrede (born 1989), German footballer
 Philipp Hofmann (born 1993), German footballer
 Philipp Öttl (born 1996), German motorcycle racer

See also
 Philippe (disambiguation)
 Phillip (disambiguation)
 Philippin

German masculine given names
Swiss masculine given names